Castle Valley is a town in Grand County, Utah, United States. The population was 319 at the 2010 census. The town is approximately 16 miles northeast of Moab, near State Route 128.

The community was named for castle-like rock formations near the town site.

Geography
According to the United States Census Bureau, the town has a total area of 8.1 square miles (20.9 km2), all land.

Demographics

At the time of 2020 census, there were 354 people residing in the town; at the time of the 2000 census, there were 349 people, 158 households, and 85 families residing in the town. The population density was 39.4 per square mile (15.2/km2). In 2000, there were 230 housing units at an average density of 28.5 per square mile (11.0/km2). The racial makeup of the town in 2000 was 97.13% White, 1.15% from other races, and 1.72% from two or more races. Hispanic or Latino of any race were 2.29% of the population.

There were 158 households, of which 19.6% had children under 18 living with them, 47.5% were married couples living together, 5.1% had a female householder with no husband present, and 45.6% were non-families. 36.1% of all households were made up of individuals, and 4.4% had someone living alone who was 65 years or older. The average household size was 2.21, and the average family size was 2.95.

Age distribution in 2000 was 20.6% under 18, 5.7% from 18 to 24, 23.8% from 25 to 44, 40.4% from 45 to 64, and 9.5% who were 65 years of age or older. The median age was 45 years. For every 100 females, there were 89.7 males. For every 100 females aged 18 and over, there were 95.1 males.

The median household income was $33,068, and the median family income was $40,500. Males had a median income of $30,500 versus $22,500 for females. The per capita income was $19,726. About 10.9% of families and 21.9% of the population were below the poverty line, including 46.7% of those under age 18 and 11.6% of those age 65 or over.

See also

 List of cities and towns in Utah
 Manti-La Sal National Forest
 Terry Tempest Williams
 DayStar Adventist Academy

References

External links

 Official site

Towns in Grand County, Utah
Towns in Utah